This list of notable policy debaters includes notable people who participated in policy debate in high school or college.

A

Samuel Alito

B

David Boies
Stephen Breyer
Ben Brown

C

Erwin Chemerinsky
Nate Cohn

D 

 Pete Davidson

H 

Michael C. Horowitz

J

Lyndon Johnson
Samuel L. Jackson

K

Neal Katyal
John F. Kennedy

L
Jennifer Lawrence

M

Carlos Maza
Michael Moore

N

Richard Nixon

P

Brad Pitt
Nancy Pelosi

R

Karl Rove

S

Bob Shrum
Ted Sorensen
Lawrence Summers

T

Laurence Tribe

W

Elizabeth Warren

References

Policy debate
Policy debaters
Policy debaters